Arçelik A.Ş. is a Turkish multinational household appliances manufacturer which owns Beko and Grundig.

The company engages in the production and marketing of durable goods, components, consumer electronics and after-sale services. Its products include white goods, electronic products, small home appliances and kitchen accessories, such as refrigerators, freezers, washing machines, dishwashers, aspirators, vacuum cleaners, coffee makers and blenders.

Arçelik A.Ş. is active in more than 100 countries including China and the United States through its 13 international subsidiaries and over 4,500 branches in Turkey. The company operates 15 production plants in Turkey, Romania, Russia, China, South Africa and Thailand including refrigerator, washing machine, dishwasher, cooking appliances and components plants. It offers products under its own Eleven brand names, including Arçelik, Beko, Grundig, Dawlance, Altus, Blomberg, Arctic, Defy, Leisure, Arstil, Elektra Bregenz and Flavel.

The company is controlled by Koç Holding, Turkey's largest industrial and services group with US$43 billion in consolidated revenues in 2008, and is the market leader in Turkey's appliance sector with its Arçelik and Beko brands. It is also the fourth largest household appliances company in Europe after BSH Hausgeräte, Electrolux and Indesit. Its top executives are Aka Gündüz Özdemir, Durable Goods President of the Koç Group, and General Manager Levent Çakıroğlu. Arçelik has been ranked "Number One in the Private Sector" for the 14th time in 19 years in "Turkey's Top 500 Industrial Corporations" survey that was carried out by the Istanbul Chamber of Industry.

History

Arçelik was founded in 1955 by Lütfü Doruk in partnership with Vehbi Koç and entered the Turkish major appliance sector by producing its first washing machine in 1959 and its first refrigerator in 1960 at its manufacturing plant in Çayırova, Istanbul. In 1968, Arçelik moved to its Çayırova facilities near Istanbul. In the 1970s and 1980s, the company expanded its product range and opened its Eskişehir refrigerator plant in 1975, İzmir vacuum cleaner plant in 1979, and Ankara dishwasher plant in 1993.

1999 was a year of growth and reorganization. Arçelik founded Ardem to manufacture cooking appliances and brought under its roof Türk Elektrik Endüstrisi A.Ş. and Atılım ve Gelişim Pazarlama A.Ş. as a single legal entity. In 2001, Arçelik took over the marketing and sales activities of Beko products that used to be marketed and sold by Beko Ticaret. The new organization model enabled the company to manage production and sales/marketing activities centrally and to increase productivity.

Most recently, the merger plan between Arçelik A.Ş. and Grundig Elektronik A.Ş. was declared on February 27, 2009.

In December 2020, Hitachi Global Life Solutions Inc. sold a 60% stake in its overseas home appliance business to Arçelik for US$300 million.

Strategy
The company's recent goal is "to possess one of the ten most preferred global brands in its sector by the year 2010". To reach this goal, brands such as Grundig, Elektra Bregenz, Blomberg, Arctic, Leisure, Flavel, and Troila have been incorporated in addition to existing Arçelik, Beko, and Altus brands.

Arçelik has focused investments on developing markets and as such, opened Beko LLC Refrigerator and Washing Machine Facility on October 13, 2006, which is the first plant constructed by Koç Holding outside Turkey.

As for the marketing and advertising strategy of the company in the UK, Beko launched an advertising campaign with the slogan: "Beko: Buy it before it becomes famous". It was widely seen on LED advertising boards used at Premier League football grounds in England. This has now changed to "Beko: Home appliances". The company used to sponsor Watford F.C., who played in the Football League Championship, during the 2007-2008 and the 2008–2009 seasons. Moreover, Beko was the main sponsor of Eurobasket 2009 and the presenting (main) sponsor of 2010 World Men's Basketball championship. In addition to these, Beko is the main sponsor of Turkish Basketball League since 2007–2008 season and German Basketball Bundesliga since 2009–2010 season.

Current position

According to company data, Arçelik/Beko holds a 7 per cent share of the European free-standing appliances market and 5 per cent of the OBM market. Beko products account for approximately two-thirds of Arçelik international sales and are among the top brands in many markets – including the UK (14 per cent share in refrigerators and 7 per cent share in washing machines) and Poland (5 per cent share).

In the last four years Arçelik has doubled its turnover, and in 2004 has registered a growth of 29% over the previous year. By the end of 2004, a total production figure of 7.4 million units has been achieved in four major production groups. Compared to last year a growth of 30% has been realized.

The 2004 turnover for the company stands at 2.7 billion euros. The sales revenue achieved through foreign sales now accounts for 44% of the total turnover. The foreign sales volume has mushroomed from 472 million euros to 1.2 billion euros in the last four years.

In Turkey, 15 million households are believed to use Arçelik products. These indicators regarding the performance are supported by the many international quality and technology awards, and other prizes Arçelik have received. In the last four years, it has continuously been selected the most admired Turkish company in all sectors.

In the United Kingdom, one in five kitchen appliances sold is made by Beko.

Brands
 Arçelik
 Beko
 Grundig (purchased by Koç Holding which owns Arçelik A.Ş.)
 Defy (purchased in July 2011)
 Altus
 Blomberg
 Arctic
 Elektra Bregenz
 Leisure
 Flavel
 Arstil
 Dawlance (One of the largest Home Appliance manufacturers of Pakistan, it was acquired by Arçelik for $258m in 2016.)
 Singer Bangladesh Limited (One of the largest Home Appliance manufacturers of Bangladesh, its 57 percent stake was acquired by Arçelik for $75 million in 2019.)

Technology and innovations

With about 300 successful patent applications, Arçelik accounts for 10% of all the patent applications in Turkey, since 1996. Moreover, in the European durable consumer goods sector Arçelik is one of the top four companies with the highest number of patents to its name.

Arçelik, which in conformity to European standards earmarks approximately 1.5% of its total annual turnover to R & D, employs 450 researchers in its central and operational R & D departments. Working towards the goal of acquiring technological leadership in its sector, the company has won some very prestigious awards in the international arena in 2004, through the products it has developed.

Gallery

Plants

In Turkey
Refrigerator Plant – Eskişehir
Washing Machine Plant – Çayırova, Istanbul
Cooking Appliances Plant – Bolu
Dishwasher Plant – Ankara
Drying Machine and Multi-Purpose Motor Plant – Çerkezköy, Tekirdağ
Compressor plant – Eskişehir
Electronical Goods plant – Beylikdüzü, Istanbul

Abroad
Refrigerator Plant - Rayong, Thailand
Cooling Appliances plant / Arctic – Găeşti, Romania
Refrigerator, Washing Machine and Electronic Appliances plants - Kirzhach, Russia
Washing Machine plant - Changzhou, China
Refrigerator - Ladysmith, South Africa
Refrigerator - East London, South Africa
Oven, Hob and Drier - Durban, South Africa
Refrigerator - Savar, Bangladesh (Singer Bangladesh)
Washing Machine plant / Arctic - Ulmi, Romania

See also 
 List of companies of Turkey

References

External links

 

Electronics companies established in 1955
Manufacturing companies based in Istanbul
Companies listed on the Istanbul Stock Exchange
Home appliance manufacturers of Turkey
Electronics companies of Turkey
Turkish brands
Koç family
Beyoğlu
Multinational companies headquartered in Turkey
Turkish companies established in 1955
Manufacturing companies established in 1955